Cell games may refer to:

 Cell games (cellular automaton), a discrete model of computation studied in automata theory
 Cell Games (Dragon Ball), a tournament and saga in Dragon Ball Z
 Mobile games, video games played on mobile phones